Jericho High School is an American comprehensive public high school in the hamlet of Jericho in Nassau County, New York.  It is the only high school in the Jericho Union Free School District.  It opened in 1959.

As of the 2014-15 school year, the school had an enrollment of 1,123 students and 99.6 classroom teachers (on an FTE basis), for a student–teacher ratio of 11.3:1. There were 25 students (2.2% of enrollment) eligible for free lunch and 3 (0.3% of students) eligible for reduced-cost lunch.

Cost of education
For the 2018-2019 school year, Jericho Public School District spent a total of $121 million for a projected number of 3200 students, of which 1124 were students of Jericho High School. $37,600 was spent per student, which is US $451,200 for a student studying for 12 years from grade 1 to 12.

In the 2011-2012 school year, Jericho Public School district spent a total of US$111,962,251 for 3026 students of K-12, of which 1202 were Jericho High School students.  US$37,000 was spent per student, which is US$444,000 for a student studying for 12 years from grade 1 to 12.

Academics
In Newsweek magazine's 2015 list of the Top 500 American High Schools, Jericho High School was ranked 27th in the U.S., and was ranked third in New York State.

Jericho High School is also consistently ranked in the top 100 high schools in the nation by U.S. News & World Reports Best High Schools ranking, as well as in the top 50 of Niche's Best Public High Schools Ranking.

The school offers many Advanced Placement classes and St. John's University college credit classes, has among the highest average SAT scores in the country, and spends more money on each student than nearly all other Long Island schools. Many Jericho graduates go on to the Ivy League institutions, NYU, SUNY, and many other first and second tier national institutions.

Extracurriculars
Jericho High School offers clubs and academic extracurricular activities, ranging from Engineering Club to chess. Jericho also has science and social science research programs, consistently producing ISEF and Regeneron STS semifinalists, as well as a few Regeneron STS finalists. Many students have won the Brain Bee held at LIU Post. The Debate Team has placed in the New York State Forensic League Championship Tournament in the Lincoln Douglas and Public Forum categories. The Science Olympiad team has placed within the top six at national invitationals, such as the Rice University Invitational, and consistently qualified for the New York State Tournament. The Drama club does two shows per year, one drama and one musical, and is known as the Harlequin Players. Other clubs include Peer Tutoring Club, Blue Key Club, Sunrise Club, Kids Helping Pets Club, Model UN, Model Congress, Quizbowl, GSA, Environmental Club, JerEcho, Girls in Engineering, SuperHeroes, and the Jericho Engineering Club.

Athletics
The sports teams are known as the Jayhawks. Jericho High School has long-standing rivalries with neighboring Great Neck South High School, Long Beach High School,Hicksville High School,Syosset High School and Roslyn High School. The 2011, 2012, 2013 and 2019 boys' varsity soccer teams won the New York State Championship.

Demographics
In the 2022-2023 school year, the number of students enrolled were:
 321 in grade 9
 301 in grade 10
 317 in grade 11
 324 in grade 12
 1263 total enrollment (grades 9 to 12)

The student body in the 2009–2010 school year consisted of:
 2 American Indian or Alaska Native students, or 0% of the student body
 26 Black or African American students, or 2% of the student body
 18 Hispanic or Latino students, or 1% of the student body
 386 Asian or Native Hawaiian/other Pacific Islander students, or 31% of the student body
 794 White students, or 65% of the student body
 17 multiracial students, or 1% of the student body
Due to an influx of Asian American residents into Jericho, by 2020, Asians made up the majority of students in Jericho Union Free School District.

Notable alumni
Madison Beer (born 1999), musician
 Jon Carin (born 1964), musician, Pink Floyd
Jordan Cila (born 1982), soccer midfielder
Adam Fox (born 1998), NHL hockey player, defenseman, New York Rangers
Jane Gross (born 1947), sportswriter, NYT columnist, author, "A Bittersweet Season"
Eric Shaw (screenwriter) (born 1973), Emmy Award-winning writer
 Jamie-Lynn Sigler (born 1981), actress; played Meadow Soprano on the HBO series The Sopranos
Russell Simins (born 1965), musician
pH-1 (rapper) (born 1989), rapper 
 Adrienne Shelly (Levine) Actress, Born 1966

References

External links
 

Public high schools in New York (state)
Schools in Nassau County, New York
1959 establishments in New York (state)